Adesmus icambi is a species of beetle in the family Cerambycidae. It was described by Martins and Galileo in 2009. It is known from Costa Rica.

References

Adesmus
Beetles described in 2009